St. Lawrence University (Uganda) (SLAU) is a private university in Uganda.

Location
The University campus is located in Mengo, Rubaga Division, in Kampala, Uganda's largest city and capital. The coordinates of the main campus of SLAU are 0° 18' 6.00"N, 32° 33' 43.00"E (Latitude:0.301667; Longitude: 32.561945).

History
The University was founded in 2006. The University took in the first class of students in September 2007.

Academic departments
SLAU is composed of five faculties:

 Faculty of Business Studies
 Faculty of Education
 Faculty of Humanities
 Faculty of Computer Science & Information Technology
 Faculty of Industrial Art & Design

Courses offered
The following courses are offered at the University:

Undergraduate degree courses
 Bachelor of Information Technology
 Bachelor of Computer Science
 Bachelor of Business Administration
 Bachelor of Arts with education
 Bachelor of Development Studies
 Bachelor of Economics
 Bachelor of Environment Management
 Bachelor of Guidance & Counseling
 Bachelor of Public Administration
 Bachelor of Mass Communication
 Bachelor of Social Work & Social Administration
 Bachelor of Industrial Art and Design
 Bachelor of International Relations and Diplomatic Studies
 Bachelor of Tourism and Hospitality Management

Diploma courses
  Diploma in Business Administration
  Diploma in Information Technology
  Diploma in Industrial Art and Design

Certificate courses
 Certificate in Information Technology
 Certificate of Industrial Art and Design

See also
 Education in Uganda
 List of universities in Uganda
 List of Ugandan university leaders
 Universities Offering Business Courses in Uganda
 Lubaga Division

References

External links
 About SLAU

Universities and colleges in Uganda
Educational institutions established in 2006
Lubaga Division
2006 establishments in Uganda